Pseudoceroprepes is a genus of snout moths described by Rolf-Ulrich Roesler in 1982.

Species
 Pseudoceroprepes nosivolella (Viette, 1964) - (Madagascar, Nigeria, Kenya)
 Pseudoceroprepes piratis (Meyrick, 1887) - (Australia, Papua New Guinea)
 Pseudoceroprepes semipectinella  (Guenée, 1862) - (Réunion)

References

Roesler, R.-U. 1982: Neue Taxa für die Phycitinen-Fauna von Madagaskar. Phycitinen-Studien XX (Lepidoptera, Pyralidae). – Bulletin du Muséum National d'Histoire Naturelle, Paris (ser. 4) 3 (1981) (section A, no. 3): 855–89

Phycitinae
Pyralidae genera